Chyorny Anuy (Çargı-Oozı) is a rural locality (a selo) and the administrative centre of Chyornoanuyskoye Rural Settlement, Ust-Kansky District, the Altai Republic, Russia. The population was 576 as of 2016. There are 8 streets.

Geography 
Chyorny Anuy is located 57 km north of Ust-Kan (the district's administrative centre) by road. Turata is the nearest rural locality.

References 

Rural localities in Ust-Kansky District